Martino Abellana (1914–1988), known as "Noy Tinong",  was a renowned Cebuano painter from Carcar. Dubbed "The Dean of Cebuano Painters", he was born to an artistic family. His main influence was his father, who was a school principal and a sculptor. Martino, along with his four brothers, including renowned sculptor and composer Dr. Ramon Abellana, were exposed to art early, and they helped their father with his sculptures.

Career
Martino pursued a career in the arts, finishing his formal art education at the School of Fine Arts of the University of the Philippines Manila. Among his teachers were the famous masters Fernando Amorsolo and Guillermo Tolentino. As an undergraduate, he helped his brother Ramon conceptualized the famous Carcar landmark, "Rotunda," by making sketches.

Martino Abellana lived, worked and taught in Cebu, despite graduating with his degree in the fine arts in Manila. He facilitated the local development of art in Cebu together with his contemporary painter and friend Professor Julian Jumalon, and helped found the fine arts program at University of the Philippines College Cebu, where he left his greatest legacy by influencing an entire generation of Cebuano painters.

Works
His lifetime of works includes [portraits], [landscapes], and [still life] glowing in oil, vibrant in pastels, vivid in charcoal, they practically pulsated with life.

See also
Dr. Ramon Abellana
Carcar, Cebu

References

External links
 Profile of Martino Abellana

1914 births
1986 deaths
University of the Philippines Manila alumni
Filipino portrait painters
People from Carcar
Artists from Cebu
Cebuano people
20th-century Filipino painters